Max Julius Friedrich Vasmer (28 February 1886 – 30 November 1962) was a Russian-German linguist. He studied problems of etymology in Indo-European, Finno-Ugric and Turkic languages and worked on the history of Slavic, Baltic, Iranian, and Finno-Ugric peoples.

Biography
Born to German parents in Saint Petersburg, Vasmer graduated from Saint Petersburg University in 1907. From 1910, he delivered lectures there as a professor. During the Russian Civil War of 1917–1922, he worked in the Universities of Saratov and of Dorpat (Tartu). In 1921, he settled in Leipzig, but in 1925 moved to Berlin. In 1938–1939, he delivered lectures at Columbia University in New York City. He delivered the eulogy for Professor Aleksander Brückner in Berlin-Wilmersdorf in 1939 and he took over the chair of Slavistic studies at the University of Berlin. In 1941 he published the book "The Slavs in Greece" (Die Slaven in Griechenland) and in 1944 the book "The Greek loanwords in Serbo-Croatian" (Die griechischen Lehnwörter im Serbo-Kroatischen).

In 1944, the bombing of Vasmer's house in Berlin destroyed most of his materials. Vasmer died in West Berlin on 30 November 1962.

The Russian translation of Vasmer's dictionary – with extensive commentaries by Oleg Trubachyov – was printed in 1964–1973. , it remains the most authoritative source for Slavic etymology. The Russian version is available on Sergei Starostin's Tower of Babel web site.

Another monumental work led by Max Vasmer involved the compilation of a multi-volume dictionary of Russian names of rivers and other bodies of water. He initiated an even grander project, completed by a team of workers after his death: the publication of a monumental (11 volumes) gazetteer that included virtually all names of populated places in Russia found both in pre-revolutionary and in Soviet sources.

See also 
 Etymological dictionary

References

External links 
 Query the Russian dictionaries at Sergei Starostin's Tower of Babel

1886 births
1962 deaths
Saint Petersburg State University alumni
People from Sankt-Peterburgsky Uyezd
Russian people of German descent
Etymologists
Linguists from Germany
Linguists from Russia
Russian language
Knights Commander of the Order of Merit of the Federal Republic of Germany
Corresponding Members of the USSR Academy of Sciences
Foreign Members of the USSR Academy of Sciences
Members of the German Academy of Sciences at Berlin
20th-century linguists
Columbia University faculty
Academic staff of Saint Petersburg State University